Orange Coast Memorial Medical Center (OCMMC) is a 240-bed community hospital in Fountain Valley, California. It is part of the four MemorialCare medical centers, located in Orange and Los Angeles counties. The 14 bed paramedic receiving Emergency Department has received awards that include CEP's Emergency Department of the Year for 2000 and was recognized as “Best in State” by Parkside Surveys in 1999 for physician care and waiting times. Their 100 percent Board certified staff average over 15 years in full-time practice.

Services
General medical and surgical care
General intensive care
Cardiology department
Neurology department
Obstetrics
Orthopedics department
Emergency department

References

Hospitals in Orange County, California